Francis Bishop may refer to:

 Francis A. Bishop, American soldier who fought in the American Civil War
 Francis Gladden Bishop (1809–1864), minor leader in the Latter Day Saint movement